Laura Süßemilch (born 23 February 1997) is a German professional racing cyclist, who currently rides for UCI Women's Continental Team .

References

External links
 

1997 births
Living people
German female cyclists
German track cyclists
People from Weingarten, Württemberg
Sportspeople from Tübingen (region)
UCI Track Cycling World Champions (women)
Cyclists from Baden-Württemberg
20th-century German women
21st-century German women